Tagasta is a genus of grasshoppers in the family Pyrgomorphidae, subfamily Pyrgomorphinae and tribe Tagastini. Species can be found around the Himalayan mountains, southern China, Indo-China and Malesia (including the Philippines). It was described in 1905.

Species
The Orthoptera Species File lists:
Tagasta anoplosterna Stål, 1877
Tagasta brachyptera Liang, 1988
Tagasta celebesica Karsch, 1888
Tagasta gui Yin, Ye & Yin, 2009
Tagasta hoplosterna Stål, 1877
Tagasta indica Bolívar, 1905
Tagasta inornata Walker, 1870
Tagasta insularis Bolívar, 1905
Tagasta longipenne Balderson & Yin, 1987
Tagasta marginella Thunberg, 1815
Tagasta mizoramensis Gupta, Chandra & Yin, 2020
Tagasta nigritibia Mao & Li, 2015
Tagasta rufomaculata Bi, 1983
Tagasta striatipennis Ramme, 1941
Tagasta tonkinensis Bolívar, 1905
Tagasta yunnana Bi, 1983

References

Pyrgomorphidae
Caelifera genera
Invertebrates of Southeast Asia